Nikolai Mikhailovich Bulgakov (born 15 January 1960) is a Russian professional football coach and a former player.

Club career
He made his professional debut in the Soviet Second League in 1977 for FC Alga Frunze.

References

1960 births
People from Osh Region
Living people
Soviet footballers
Association football defenders
Russian footballers
Russian Premier League players
FC Alga Bishkek players
PFC CSKA Moscow players
PFC Krylia Sovetov Samara players
FC Baltika Kaliningrad players
FC Kristall Smolensk players
Russian football managers
FC Iskra Smolensk players